Cái Bè is a river-land mixed town in Vietnam. It is a rural district of Tiền Giang province in the Mekong Delta region of Vietnam. Along the river, there are docks that handle passengers and goods, and the floating market. Cái Bè is the north shore of Mỹ Thuận bridge, the gateway to the city of Vĩnh Long and the Cửu Long River Delta. As of 2003, the district had a population of 290,457. The district covers an area of 421 km². The district capital lies at Cái Bè.

References

Districts of Tiền Giang province